The CBC Symphony Orchestra (CBCSO/OSSRC) was a radio orchestra based in Toronto, Ontario, Canada. It was operated by the Canadian Broadcasting Corporation during the 1950s and 1960s.

History
The CBCSO was founded in 1952, and gave its first broadcast on 29 September 1952 performing Jean Sibelius's Symphony No. 3 and the overture to Gioachino Rossini's opera La Cenerentola. Conductor Geoffrey Waddington served as the orchestra'a only music director, although other conductors, such as Jean-Marie Beaudet, had strong ties with the orchestra. The CBCSO consisted of 80 instrumentalists of which approximately half were also members of the Toronto Symphony Orchestra. Violinist Albert Pratz was concertmaster of the orchestra from 1953–1961.

The CBCSO played weekly broadcasts on CBC Radio and also made frequent appearances on CBC Television. The orchestra performed internationally, including a tour in London, England, and a performance at the Inter-American Music Festival in 1961.  Many of its performances were recorded by Radio Canada International and distributed outside Canada. The orchestra recorded with the Mendelssohn Choir, with CBC's Festival Singers, and with pianist Glenn Gould.

The CBCSO performed and recorded many of the works of composer/conductor Igor Stravinsky, including his Symphony of Psalms, which featured Stravinsky as conductor and violinist Steven Staryk as concertmaster.

The orchestra disbanded in 1964.

References

1952 establishments in Ontario
1964 disestablishments in Ontario
Canadian Broadcasting Corporation
Canadian orchestras
Musical groups from Toronto
Radio and television orchestras
Disbanded orchestras
Musical groups established in 1952
Musical groups disestablished in 1964